This page lists all of the numbered county roads in Norfolk County, Ontario, Canada.

Roads in Norfolk County, Ontario
Norfolk